A burlak was a towpath puller in Russian Empire.

Overview
The exact origin of the word is unknown. Different versions include old middle-German bûrlach (working team with fixed rules, artel), or Tatar bujdak, 'homeless'.

Burlaks appeared in Russia at the end of 16th century and beginning of the 17th century. With the expansion of freight-hauling, the number of burlaks increased.

The chief of a burlak gang was called Vodoliv, the next in line was the Dyadya (captain), followed by the Shishka (first in the line of haulers), while the last in line was called Kosny (last in the line of haulers). 

There were seasonal burlaks, who worked from spring to autumn, and temporary burlaks, who worked occasionally. Burlaks did not work in winter, when most Russian rivers were frozen over.

The main areas of the burlaks' trade in the Russian Empire were the Volga river, from Moscow to Astrakhan, the White Sea route (Belomor'e), from Moscow to Arkhangelsk, and the Dnieper river, in Ukraine.

Most burlaks were landless or poor peasants from Simbirsk, Saratov, Samara, Yaroslavl, Kostroma, Vladimir, Ryazan, Tambov and Penza areas.

Burlaks joined up in an artel (typically from four to six, sometimes ten to forty, and occasionally up 150 people) mainly in winter, despite that at this time clients paid the lowest price, because in winter burlaks were often otherwise unemployed. The final payments were in autumn, after finishing work.

With the coming of the industrial revolution, the number of burlaks declined: at the beginning of the nineteenth century about 600,000 burlaks worked on the Volga and Oka rivers; in the middle of nineteenth century, 150,000, and by the beginning of the twentieth burlaks had all but disappeared.

The burlak was a subject of Russian songs (famously performed by Feodor Chaliapin, The Volga Boatmen's Song etc.), and artwork (Burlaks on the Volga by Ilya Yefimovich Repin).

See also
 Towpath

External links
Vladimir Gilyarovsky, "My Travels (Мои скитания)" This book contains a chapter on his Volga boat-puller experience in 1871. 
The Volga river's boatmen or The enchanted wanderers of river "Ra", a photogallery

Russian Empire
Obsolete occupations
Maritime history of Russia